Jennifer Hennessy (born Jennifer Hayes in 1970) is an English actress. She has made numerous television appearances, including as Mrs. Brazendale in the BBC TV series Lilies.

Hennessy trained for three years at the Central School of Speech and Drama, graduating in 1992. She has since appeared in a number of theatrical roles, as well as on television, including the character of Jude in The Office; Julie, the man-hating shop-assistant, in the "Fockin Mokky Bokka" episode of Two Pints of Lager and a Packet of Crisps; and, in 2007, as Valerie Brannigan (the wife of Ardal O'Hanlon's character, Thomas Kincade Brannigan) in "Gridlock", an episode of Doctor Who, playing a vet in the BBC3 comedy "Pulling" (2008) and in the BBC mini-series South Riding in 2011.

As a child, Hennessy was a member of the St Winifred's School Choir which reached number one on the UK Singles Chart in 1980 with the song "There's No-one Quite Like Grandma". She also starred in BBC One drama Dickensian, a series based on Charles Dickens' characters. She played the role of Emily Cratchit, a character in A Christmas Carol. She returned to Doctor Who in 2017, playing Moira, the foster mother of Bill Potts.

Filmography

Film

Television

References

External links

Living people
Alumni of the Royal Central School of Speech and Drama
1970 births
Actors from Stockport